Lukas Loules (né Hilbert, born 23 December 1972) is a German songwriter, composer, music producer, and singer. In 2014, he married Katerina Loules and changed his surname from Hilbert to Loules.

Career

Hilbert founded a band called the Future with his brother Kieran when he was 12 years old. They toured Germany until Udo Lindenberg took the brothers into his Panikorchester. At the same time, Lukas and Kieran Hilbert founded a rock band called Hauden & Lukas, and Lukas began writing songs with Lindenberg. He worked on the 1991 Lindenberg album Ich will dich haben, which won a golden disc, before releasing two less-successful solo albums.

He achieved his first notable success as a lyricist when the single "Du mußt ein Schwein sein" performed by Die Prinzen reached the top ten in Germany in 1995. In 1996, he wrote the lyrics for the Blümchen song "Boomerang".

In 1996, Hilbert founded a band called Roh in Hamburg with Carsten Pape and Meik Dobbratz. The band released three albums, in 1996, 1998, and 2000 (Rohmantisch). Following a tour with Peter Maffay, the band split 

In 2003, Hilbert produced and sang on the Oli.P singles "Neugeboren" and "Alles ändert sich". Also in 2003, he wrote the lyrics for the Dieter Bohlen production of "Für Dich", sung by Yvonne Catterfeld, which reached number one in the German singles charts.

In December 2004, the single "Was ich an dir mag", on which Hilbert performed as a solo singer, reached number three in the German singles charts. He appeared as a member of the jury in the Popstars TV series, and produced the debut single "Sweetest Poison" of the band Nu Pagadi, which was formed from that series. The single reached number one on the German singles charts. He wrote lyrics and produced the number one album Laut und Leise by Peter Maffay. In January 2005, Hilbert released a solo album with the title Der König bin ich. In 2005, Hilbert performed with Trina with the song "Kommt meine Liebe nicht bei dir an" representing Bremen in the Bundesvision Song Contest 2005, placing 11th with 31 points.

In late 2006, Hilbert wrote the song "Erinner mich Dich zu vergessen", sung by Yvonne Catterfeld, which reached the top ten in Germany. On 3 November 2006, he released the single "Ganze Welt" on which he sang with Katerina Loules, also known as Tryna, who had been a contestant on Popstars. In December 2006, he sang his composition "In Dir Ist Immer Noch Ein Licht", with Peter Maffay, Udo Jürgens, José Carreras, and Piero Masuchett as the opening song at the José Carreras Gala 2006.

In 2008, Hilbert wrote the title track of Peter Maffay's number one album Ewig.

In 2010, Hilbert composed the single "Missing You" for the girl group The Saturdays together with Alexander Kronlund. The single was his first success in the UK and reached number three. It spent three weeks at number one in the radio charts.

In 2011, Hilbert moved to Los Angeles and worked together with the South Korean girl group Wonder Girls. He co-wrote and co-produced their song "Nu Shoes" and the first American release "Like Money" feat. Akon.
 
In 2012, Hilbert co-wrote and co-produced Carly Rae Jepsen's song "Tonight I'm Getting Over You".

He did the "Hilbert remix" for Taylor Swift's Billboard number one song "We Are Never Ever Getting Back Together".

In 2012, Hilbert co-wrote the Kesha song "All That Matters (The Beautiful Life)" with Kesha, Max Martin, Shellback, Savan Kotecha, and Alexander Kronlund.

In 2012, Hilbert  co-wrote and produced Chris Brown's single "Nobody's Perfect"

In 2012, Hilbert co-wrote and co-produced Carly Rae Jepsen and Nicki Minaj's song "Tonight I'm Getting Over You".

In 2013, Hilbert co-wrote and produced G.R.L.'s song "Girls Are Always Right".

In 2014, Hilbert married Katerina Loules and changed his name to Lukas Loules. Loules wrote and produced David Guetta's song "Sun Goes Down", which appeared on Guetta's album Listen.

In 2015, Lukas Loules co-wrote and co-produced the Tori Kelly song "Expensive", co-wrote and produced the Adam Lambert song "The Light" co-wrote and produced the Carly Rae Jepsen song "I Didn't Just Come Here to Dance" and co-wrote and co-produced the Tinashe feat. Chris Brown song "Player".

In 2016, Loules produced and co-wrote "Fifth Harmony The Life", a song performed by American girl group Fifth Harmony under his producer name "Lulou". The song is written by Tinashe, Lukas Loules and Alexander Kronlund and vocal produced by Tryna Loules 

In 2016, Loules produced and co-wrote "Fifth Harmony  That's My Girl", a song performed by American girl group Fifth Harmony under his producer name "Lulou". The song is written by Tinashe, Loules and Alexander Kronlund and vocal produced by Tryna Loules  it was released as the 3rd Single of the Album.

In 2016, Loules produced and co-wrote the Daya song "Got The Feeling" under his producer name "Lulou".

In 2017, Loules produced and co-wrote the Era Istrefi and French Montana song "No I Love Yous" under his producer name "Lulou".

In 2017, Loules produced and co-wrote the Tove Lo feat. Daye Jack song "Romantics" as the first ChampionsLeak production team release together with Choukri Gustmann.

In 2017, Loules co-wrote and produced two songs on the Vanessa Mai album Regenbogen which reached No. 1 in the German Album Charts 

In 2017, Loules started his project "ChampionsLeak" together with his production partner Choukri. They released the songs "Fuck the Pain Away" "Emotional" and "Happy For You" independently.

In 2018, Loules co-wrote seven songs and produced five songs for the Vanessa Mai album Schlager, which also reached No. 1 on the German Album Charts.

In 2020, Loules co-wrote and produced the Pop Idol Sweden Winner song "Used to me", together with Alexander Kronlund.

Discography

 1984 - The Future - Isabell Pubertät & Ich bin wie ich bin!
 1988 - Hauden & Lukas - Kopfhörer
 1991 - Lukas - Lukas
 1991 - Udo Lindenberg - Album Ich will Dich haben
 1992 - Lukas - S.O.S.
 1992 - Lukas - Astronauten
 1993 - Lukas - Simsalabim
 1993 - Lukas - Schenk mir dein Herz
 1993 - Lukas - Gameboy
 1994 - Fabian Harloff - Liebe pur
 1995 - Die Prinzen - Du mußt ein Schwein sein
 1996 - Blümchen - Boomerang
 1996 - Fabian Harloff - I Follow You
 1996 - ROH - Ich möchte nicht mehr mit der KF verwechselt werden
 1997 - Blümchen - Schmetterlinge
 1997 - Blümchen - Achterbahn
 1997 - Roh - Wie krieg ich die Zeit bis zu meiner Beerdigung noch rum
 1997 - ROH - Onanie ist voll in Ordnung, egal wie alt du bist
 1998 - Roh - Was viele nicht zu singen wagten
 1999 - Roh - Rohmantisch album
 1999 - ROH - Ich liebe dich
 1996 - Fabian Harloff - I Follow You
 1999 - Blümchen - Heut ist mein Tag
 2000 - Blümchen - Denkst du manchmal noch an mich ?
 2000 - Peter Maffay feat. Roh - Rette mich
 2000 - ROH - Du brennst immer noch in mir
 2002 - Big Brother - Ulf Du Bist Das Groesste
 2002 - Big Brother - Ulf Ich Liebe Das Leben
 2002 - Big Brother - Hella & Sava Liebst Du Mich
 2002 - Big Brother - Hella & Sava In Meinen Traeumen
 2003 - Yvonne Catterfeld - Für Dich
 2003 - Dogma - In den Himmel fallen
 2003 - Die Prinzen - Monarchie in Germany
 2003 - Oli P. feat. Lukas - Alles ändert sich
 2003 - Oli P. feat. Lukas - Neugeboren
 2004 - Nu Pagadi - Sweetest Poison
 2004 - Nu Pagadi - Darkside
 2004 - Nu Pagadi - Dying Words
 2004 - Big Brother Allstars - Unser Haus
 2004 - Dschungel Allstars - Ich bin ein Star - holt mich hier raus!
 2004 - Lukas Hilbert - Was ich an dir mag
 2004 - Lukas Hilbert - Weihnachten wär geiler, wär der Weihnachtsmann 'ne Frau
 2004 - Nu Pagadi - Sweetest Poison
 2004 - Big Brother Allstars - Unser Haus
 2004 - Oli P. - Unsterblich
 2004 - Dschungel Allstars - Ich bin ein Star - holt mich hier raus!
 2004 - Oli P. - Unsterblich
 2005 - Lukas & Tryna Hilbert - Kommt meine Liebe nicht bei dir an
 2005 - Lukas Hilbert - Stell dir vor
 2005 - Lukas Hilbert - Du bist ich (Title song of the ProSieben series Freunde)
 2005 - Lukas Hilbert - Der König bin ich
 2006 - U96 feat. Ben - Vorbei
 2006 - Yvonne Catterfeld - Erinner mich Dich zu vergessen
 2006 - U96 feat. Ben - Vorbei
 2006 - U96 feat. Das Bo feat. Tryna - Put on the Red Light
 2006 - Lukas & Tryna Hilbert - Ganze Welt
 2007 - Ben & Kate Hall - Bedingungslos
 2007 - Lisa Bund - Learn to Love You
 2007 - Basta - Deutsche
 2007 - Peter Maffay - Lass es schnein, Wenn der Weihnachtsmann die Grippe kriegt
 2008 - Christina Stürmer - Träume leben ewig
 2008 - Alex C. feat Y-ass - Du bist so Porno
 2008 - Alex C. feat Y-ass - Liebe Zu Dritt
 2008 - Ben & Kate Hall - 2 Herzen
 2008 - Truck Stop - Cowboys sterben nicht, Hamburger Wind, Rosa von der Raste
 2008 - Peter Maffay - Ewig, In dir ist immer noch ein Licht, Wie im Himmel
 2009 - Sarah Kreuz - If One Bird Sings
 2010 - Trynamite - Scheiss Männer
 2010 - Venke Knutson - "Jealous 'Cause I Love You"
 2010 - The Saturdays - "Missing You"
 2010 - Black Pony
 2011 - Wonder Girls - "Nu Shoes"
 2011 - Encore - "Fun Last Night"
 2012 - loona - "Policia"
 2012 - Alex C - "Love In The Morning"
 2012 - Alex C - "Bis 5 Uhr Am Morgen"
 2012 - Wonder Girls feat. Akon - "Like Money"
 2012 - Carly Rae Jepsen - "Tonight I'm Getting Over You"
 2012 - Ke$ha - "All That Matters (The Beautiful Life)"
 2012 - Chris Brown - "Nobody's Perfect"
 2013 - Carly Rae Jepsen feat. Nicki Minaj - "Tonight I'm Getting Over You"
 2014 - G.R.L. - "Girls Are Always Right"
 2014 - David Guetta - "Sun Goes Down"
 2015 - Tori Kelly - "Expensive"
 2015 - Adam Lambert - "The Light"
 2015 - Carly Rae Jepsen - "I Didn't Just Come Here to Dance"
 2015 - Tinashe feat. Chris Brown - "Player"
 2016 - Fifth Harmony - "The Life"
 2016 - Fifth Harmony - "That's My Girl"
 2016 - Daya - "Got The Feeling"
 2017 - Era Istrefi & French Montana - "No I Love Yous"
 2017 - Tove Lo Feat. Daye Jack - "Romantics"
 2020 - Pop Idol Sweden Winner Song - "Used To Me"

References

External links
  Official Website
  313 Music
 

German record producers
German rock singers
German songwriters
Participants in the Bundesvision Song Contest
Musicians from Hamburg
1972 births
Living people
21st-century German male singers